Pentaceraster is a genus of sea stars in the family Oreasteridae.

Selected species
List of species according to the World Register of Marine Species:
 Pentaceraster affinis (Müller & Troschel, 1842)
 Pentaceraster alveolatus (Perrier, 1875)
 Pentaceraster chinensis (J.E.Gray, 1840)
 Pentaceraster cumingi (J.E.Gray, 1840)
 Pentaceraster decipiens (Bell, 1884)
 Pentaceraster gracilis (Lütken, 1871)
 Pentaceraster horridus (J.E.Gray, 1840)
 Pentaceraster magnificus (Goto, 1914)
 Pentaceraster mammillatus (Audouin, 1826)
 Pentaceraster multispinus (von Martens, 1866)
 Pentaceraster regulus (Müller & Troschel, 1842)
 Pentaceraster sibogae Döderlein, 1916
 Pentaceraster tuberculatus (Müller & Troschel, 1842)
 Pentaceraster westermanni (Lütken, 1871)

References

Oreasteridae
Taxa named by Ludwig Heinrich Philipp Döderlein